Baire may refer to:

René-Louis Baire, French mathematician
Tekeste Baire, Eritrean trade unionist
Baire Benítez, Cuban chess player
Baire, village in the municipality of Contramaestre, Cuba

See also
, many things named after René-Louis Baire